The 2019–20 Ole Miss Rebels men's basketball team represented the University of Mississippi in the 2019–20 NCAA Division I men's basketball season, their 110th basketball season. The Rebels were led by second-year head coach, Kermit Davis. The Rebels played their games at The Pavilion at Ole Miss in Oxford, Mississippi as members of the Southeastern Conference. They finished the season 15–17, 6–12 in SEC play to finish in 12th place. They lost in the first round of the 2020 SEC tournament to Georgia.

Previous season
The Rebels finished the 2018–19 season 20–13, 10–8 in SEC play to finish in a tie for sixth place. They lost in the first round of the NCAA tournament to Oklahoma, their first appearance since 2015.

Offseason

Departures

Incoming transfers

2019 recruiting class

Preseason

SEC media poll
The SEC media poll was released on October 15, 2019.

Preseason All-SEC teams
The Rebels had one player selected to the preseason all-SEC teams.

First Team

Breein Tyree

Roster

Schedule and results

|-
|-
!colspan=12 style=|Exhibition

|-
!colspan=12 style=|Non-conference regular season

|-
!colspan=12 style=|SEC regular season

|-
!colspan=12 style=| SEC tournament

See also
2019–20 Ole Miss Rebels women's basketball team

References 

Ole Miss
Ole Miss Rebels men's basketball seasons
Ole Miss Rebels men's basketball
Ole Miss Rebels men's basketball